Frankie Laine and the Four Lads is an album recorded by Frankie Laine together with the male spiritual group the Four Lads. It was dropped by Columbia Records sometime in the first half of 1956 when the Four Lads were flying high on the U.S. singles charts.

Laine and the Four Lads had already had a hit together — in 1954 with a song titled "Rain, Rain, Rain" that reached number 30 in the United States and number 8 in the UK. That song was among the 12 tracks selected for the album.

Track listing

References 

1956 albums
Frankie Laine albums
The Four Lads albums
Columbia Records albums